Psalm 5 is the fifth psalm of the Book of Psalms, beginning in English in the King James Version: "Give ear to my words, O LORD, consider my meditation". In Latin, it is known as "Verba mea auribus percipe Domine". The psalm is traditionally attributed  to David. It is a reflection of how the righteous man prays for deliverance not only for freedom from suffering, but to allow himself to be able to serve God without distraction. The New King James Version entitles it "A Prayer for Guidance".

The psalm is a regular part of Jewish, Catholic, Lutheran, Anglican and other Protestant liturgies. It has been set to music by composers such as Heinrich Schütz, Felix Mendelssohn and Edward Elgar.

Text

Hebrew 
The following is the Hebrew text of Psalm 5:

King James Version 
 Give ear to my words, O LORD, consider my meditation.
 Hearken unto the voice of my cry, my King, and my God: for unto thee will I pray.
 My voice shalt thou hear in the morning, O LORD; in the morning will I direct my prayer unto thee, and will look up.
 For thou art not a God that hath pleasure in wickedness: neither shall evil dwell with thee.
 The foolish shall not stand in thy sight: thou hatest all workers of iniquity.
 Thou shalt destroy them that speak leasing: the LORD will abhor the bloody and deceitful man.
 But as for me, I will come into thy house in the multitude of thy mercy: and in thy fear will I worship toward thy holy temple.
 Lead me, O LORD, in thy righteousness because of mine enemies; make thy way straight before my face.
 For there is no faithfulness in their mouth; their inward part is very wickedness; their throat is an open sepulchre; they flatter with their tongue.
 Destroy thou them, O God; let them fall by their own counsels; cast them out in the multitude of their transgressions; for they have rebelled against thee.
 But let all those that put their trust in thee rejoice: let them ever shout for joy, because thou defendest them: let them also that love thy name be joyful in thee.
 For thou, LORD, wilt bless the righteous; with favour wilt thou compass him as with a shield.

Themes

Psalm 5 is within the genre of the morning prayer, because the morning was very important in the religions of the ancient Near East. Hence verse 4:
In the morning, Lord, you hear my voice; in the morning I lay my requests before you and wait expectantly.
The Psalm opens as a lament, continues with praise, and requests that God punish evildoers. The psalmist describes the throat of the wicked as an open sepulcher. The Psalmist ends (verse 12 or 13) with a blessing extended to all those who trust in God.

Interpretation
The correct translation of the word Hebrew word הַנְּחִילֹ֗ות (in the superscription or verse 1) is unclear; the NRSV and the Luther Bible give it as "for flute".

The Septuagint, Vulgate and some Arabic translations attribute נחל from "inherit" meaning "per ea quae haereditatem consequitur"(vulgate) and κληρονομος (Septuagint). Accordingly, it would be translated into English as "in favor of those who receive the inheritance". Therefore Augustine, Cassiodorus and others interpreted it as "those heirs of God".

A thoroughly Christological interpretation can be found in Martin Luther's work, who finds the third verse revealing that the humanization of man happens through the incarnation of Jesus Christ.

Gerhard Ebeling sees in the Psalm both as complaining (verse 10) and also at the same time as exultation and rejoicing (verse 12).

Context
Psalm 5 uses musical instruments, flutes. Psalm 4 is the first Psalm using a musical instrument, strings or "stringed instruments".

A new theme is introduced, the name of God, in verse 11:
But let all who take refuge in you rejoice; let them ever sing for joy, and spread your protection over them, that those who love your name may exult in you.
This is the first of five psalms (Psalms 5 - 9) all speaking of "the name of God", with nine verses speaking to various aspects, namely Ps 5:11, Ps 6:5, Ps 7:17, Ps 8:1, Ps 8:9, Ps 9:2, Ps 9:5 and Ps 9:10. Various types of flow in the Book of Psalms are explored by various authors such as O. Palmer Robertson.

An emphasis of a particular genre of Psalm, the lament. In Ps 5:1 where God is called on to 'listen to my lament'. The most common genre of Psalm in the book of Psalms will be the lament. Laments can be seen to occur more heavily in the first half of the book of Psalms,

Uses

Judaism
In Judaism, verse 8 of psalm 5 is the second verse from Ma Tovu.

New Testament

Catholic Church
According to the Rule of St. Benedict (530 AD), Psalm 1 to Psalm 20 were mainly reserved for office of Prime. Since the time of St. Benedict, the Rule of Benedict (530 AD) has used this psalm for the office Lauds on Monday (Chapter XIII) In the Liturgy of the Hours, Psalm 5 is still recited or sung at Lauds on Monday of the first week.

Book of Common Prayer
In the Church of England's Book of Common Prayer, Psalm 5 is appointed to be read on the morning of the first day of the month.

Music
Caspar cross Hamer (1546) created in 1537 the chorale An geystlich Bitlied drawn heavily from the Psalms.

Heinrich Schütz composed a setting of a metred version in German, "Herr, hör, was ich will bitten dich", SWV 101, published in 1628 in the Becker Psalter. Felix Mendelssohn composed a setting of Psalm 5 in English, "Lord, hear the voice" for men's chorus in 1839). In 1911, Edward Elgar dedicated a setting for choir and orchestra, "Intende voci orationis meæ", as an offertory for the coronation of King George V.

References

External links 

 
 
  in Hebrew and English - Mechon-mamre
 Text of Psalm 5 according to the 1928 Psalter
 For the leader; with wind instruments. A psalm of David. / Give ear to my words, O LORD; understand my sighing. (text and footnotes) United States Conference of Catholic Bishops
 Psalm 5:1 (introduction and text) biblestudytools.com
 Psalm 5 – A Morning Prayer enduringword.com
 Psalm 5 / Refrain: You, O Lord, will bless the righteous. Church of England
 Psalm 5 at biblegateway.com
 Hymns for Psalm 5 hymnary.org

005
Works attributed to David